Figure skating competitions at the 1999 European Youth Olympic Winter Days were held in Poprad-Tatry, Slovakia between March 6 and 12. Skaters competed in the disciplines of men's singles, ladies' singles, and Ice dancing.

Results

Men

Ladies

Ice dance

References

External links
 results

European Youth Olympic Festival
Figure skating
Figure skating in Slovakia